Rolf Biland (born 1 April 1951) is a Swiss former sidecar racer. He is known not only for his seven FIM Sidecar World Championships and 80 Grand Prix wins, but for his experimentation and innovation with new types of machine, like the Seymaz, the BEO and the LCR. His success was not limited to Grand Prix tracks, as he finished second at the Isle of Man Sidecar TT at his first attempt. Biland was instrumental in the development of the Swissauto V4 engine and won his last world title using it.

Biland retired from sidecar competition and became team manager for the Muz 500 team in 1999, renaming it Team Biland GP1. The team had some success but failed to secure a sponsor and folded at the end of that year.

Biland now runs Karting events in Switzerland.

References

External links
 Biland Events Official Homepage
 Superside.com (inactive site, September 2014)
 IoM TT Database Competitor Profile and images

1951 births
Living people
Swiss motorcycle racers
Sidecar racers
Swiss racing drivers
Isle of Man TT riders
European Formula Two Championship drivers
Place of birth missing (living people)